"Natal" ("Christmas"), also titled "Esperança do Natal" ("Hope for Christmas") on the parent album and on the single cover back, is a 1990 song recorded by Brasilian duo Chico & Roberta. Written by Jean-Claude Bonaventure and Monica Nogueira, it was the released in December 1990 as the second single from the duo's first album Frente a frente, on which it appears as the second track. It was successful, becoming a top three hit.

Chart performance
In France, "Natal" debuted at number 24 on the chart edition of 4 January 1991, while the duo's first single "Frente a frente" was at its peak of number five; then it performed the biggest single-week upward movement, gaining 15 positions to reach number nine, and entered the top five the next week. It peaked at number three for non consecutive three weeks, blocked by the international two hits "Wind of Change" and "Sadeness (Part I)". It totalled ten weeks in the top five and 21 weeks in the top 50. It achieved Gold status, awarded by the Syndicat National de l'Édition Phonographique, the French certificator, for over 250,000 units sold. On the Eurochart Hot 100, "Natal" entered at number 43 on 26 January 1991, peaked at number 14 in its tenth week, and totalled 18 weeks on the chart.

Track listings
 CD single
 "Esperança do natal" — 3:00
 "Cor de cetim" — 4:00

 7" single
 "Esperança do natal" — 3:00
 "Cor de cetim" — 4:00

Credits
 Engineer – Alain Pype
 Photography – Sweeva Vigeno
 Producer – Jean-Claude Bonaventure

Charts and sales

Weekly charts

Year-end charts

Certifications

Release history

References

1990 songs
1991 singles
Chico & Roberta songs
Male–female vocal duets
Christmas songs